The Southeast Missouri State Redhawks men's basketball team represents Southeast Missouri State University in Cape Girardeau, Missouri, United States.  The school's team currently competes in the Ohio Valley Conference. The Redhawks play their home games at the Show Me Center. Prior to January 2005, the team's nickname was the Indians. Prior to joining NCAA Division I in 1991, they participated in the NAIA and NCAA Division II. They were NAIA national champions in 1943. They last appeared in the NCAA tournament in 2023 after clinching an automatic bid to the tournament.

Postseason results

NCAA Division I Tournament
The Redhawks have appeared in two NCAA Division I Tournaments. Their combined record is 0–2.

NCAA Division II Tournament
The Redhawks have appeared in 13 NCAA Division II Tournaments. Their combined record is 28–14.

NAIA Tournament
The Redhawks have appeared in one NAIA Tournament. Their record is 5–0 and were national champions in 1943, their only appearance in the tournament.

Notable players

NBA
Southeast Missouri State has had 2 former players who have gone on to play in the NBA.

References

External links